New Caledonian gecko may refer to any of the below, both genera placed in the Diplodactylidae family, and found in New Caledonia:
 Any of 12 species of geckos in the genus Bavayia 
 Any of 9 species of geckos in the genus Dierogekko
 Paniegekko madjo, a species in a monotypic genus

Animal common name disambiguation pages